Nijhuis is a Dutch toponymic surname. It is a form of Nieuwenhuis ("new house") originating in the Twente region of Overijssel. Notable people with the surname include:

Alfred Nijhuis (born 1966), Dutch football defender
Bas Nijhuis (born 1977), Dutch football referee
Jos Nijhuis (born 1957), Dutch businessman, CEO of Schiphol Group 2009 – 2018
Marloes Nijhuis (born 1991), Dutch waterpolo player
Michelle Nijhuis (born 1974), American science journalist  
Moniek Nijhuis (born 1988), Dutch breaststroke swimmer
Rudi Nijhuis (born c. 1950), drummer in the band Teach-In
Thijmen Nijhuis (born 1998), Dutch football goalkeeper
Thijs Nijhuis (born 1992), Dutch-born Danish long-distance runner

See also
Nijenhuis, Niehues, Nienhuis, different forms of the same surname
Ryan Nyhuis (born 1996), Australian rules footballer
Albert Neuhuys (1844–1914), Dutch painter
 (1854–1914), Dutch playwright

References

Dutch-language surnames
Toponymic surnames